Provalljapyx is a genus of diplurans in the family Japygidae.

Species
 Provalljapyx brasiliensis Smith, 1962
 Provalljapyx lanei Silvestri, 1948

References

Diplura